Chamunorwa Justice "Chamu" Chibhabha (born 9 September 1986) is a Zimbabwean cricketer who bats right-handed and bowls right-arm medium pace. In January 2020, Zimbabwe Cricket named him as the captain of Zimbabwe's One Day International (ODI) and Twenty20 International (T20I) squads on an interim basis.

Domestic career
Chibhabha made his maiden first-class century at Harare against Sri Lanka A. The match was drawn, and he made 40 and 103. In his previous first-class match, against South Africa Academy, he made 98 before being run out.

He was the leading wicket-taker for the Mashonaland Eagles in the 2018–19 Logan Cup, with sixteen dismissals in five matches. In December 2020, he was named as the captain of the Eagles for the 2020–21 Logan Cup.

Personal life
His sister Julia Chibhabha also plays international cricket for the Zimbabwe national women's team. She was captain for Zimbabwe's World Cup qualifiers in Pakistan in November 2007.

International career
Chibhabha made a duck on international debut, against New Zealand during the 2005–06 Videocon Tri–Series. Chibhabha has also played first class matches for Mashonaland, and earned a recall to the national side in April 2006, when the team toured West Indies. In the first ODI, he top scored with 55, but his six overs cost thirty runs, and Zimbabwe lost by five wickets.

Chibhabha showed excellent talent during the Indian tour of Zimbabwe in 2015. He was the highest run scorer in the twenty20 series and Zimbabwe won their first Twenty20 International against India. He top scored in this match with 67 and earned man of the match and man of the series as well.

In July 2016 he was named in Zimbabwe's Test squad for their series against New Zealand. On 28 July 2016 he made his Test debut for Zimbabwe against New Zealand. He played in the most ODIs for Zimbabwe before making his Test debut.

He's also having the joint record for taking the most catches by a substitute fielder in a T20I innings, along with Jeetan Patel, Eoin Morgan, Hashim Amla, Johnson Charles and Jonathan Carter.

In June 2018, he was named in a Board XI team for warm-up fixtures ahead of the 2018 Zimbabwe Tri-Nation Series.

Chibhabha was the last batsman, and the only Zimbabwe player, to be out handled the ball in an international match, before that mode of dismissal was abolished in 2017.

Following an almost two-year absence from Test cricket, Zimbabwe would schedule West Indian cricket team in Zimbabwe in 2022–23 to be played in February 2023, and Chibhabha would be named in the squad, going on to play his first test in five and a half years in the 1st Test.

References

External links
 
 

1986 births
Living people
Zimbabwean cricketers
Zimbabwe Test cricketers
Zimbabwe One Day International cricketers
Zimbabwe Twenty20 International cricketers
Cricketers at the 2007 Cricket World Cup
Mashonaland cricketers
Centrals cricketers
Cricketers at the 2015 Cricket World Cup
Zimbabwe Select XI cricketers